Ana Siljak is a Canadian historian and writer. She is best known for her Charles Taylor Prize-nominated book Angel of Vengeance: The Girl Assassin, the Governor of St. Petersburg and Russia's Revolutionary World, a biography of Vera Zasulich published in 2008.

She is a professor of Russian and Eastern European history at Queen's University in Kingston, Ontario, and has contributed reviews of history and non-fiction books to the Literary Review of Canada. She has a PhD in history from Harvard University. She was also coauthor with Philipp Ther of Redrawing Nations: Ethnic Cleansing in East-Central Europe, 1944-1948 (2001).

References

21st-century Canadian historians
Canadian literary critics
Women literary critics
Writers from Ontario
Academic staff of Queen's University at Kingston
Harvard University alumni
Living people
Canadian biographers
21st-century Canadian women writers
Historians of Russia
Women biographers
21st-century biographers
Canadian women historians
Year of birth missing (living people)